RM Films International is a film distribution company based in Hollywood, California. It was started by filmmaker Russ Meyer to distribute his movies. Since Meyer's death in 2004, RM Films International has been owned and operated by the Russ Meyer Charitable Trust and is a recognized 501(c) private foundation.

With the exceptions of Fanny Hill and the two movies he made for 20th Century Fox (Beyond the Valley of the Dolls and The Seven Minutes), Russ Meyer retained the rights to all of the features he directed. RM Films International is currently the only official source for most of Meyer's films, including:

 The Immoral Mr. Teas (1959)
 Eve and the Handyman (1961)
 Wild Gals of the Naked West (1962)
 Europe in the Raw (1963)
 Lorna (1964)
 Faster, Pussycat! Kill! Kill! (1965)
 Motorpsycho (1965)
 Mudhoney (1965)
 Mondo Topless (1966)
 Common Law Cabin (1967)
 Good Morning and... Goodbye! (1967)
 Finders Keepers, Lovers Weepers! (1968)
 Vixen! (1968)
 Cherry, Harry & Raquel! (1970)
 Black Snake (1973)
 Supervixens (1975)
 Up! (1976)
 Beneath the Valley of the Ultra-Vixens (1979)

External links

References

Film distributors of the United States
Companies based in Los Angeles
501(c)(3) organizations